The Weisscam Company develops digital high-speed cameras. The cameras are mainly used in commercials, imagefilms and in shootings of athletic activities.
The Weisscam Company was founded by Director of Photography (DoP) Stefan Weiss.

History 
 2005
Starting the development of the first prototype of WEISSCAM HS-1 and using this camera for international commercials.

2006–2007
After many successful highspeed shootings with the very first prototype, WEISSCAM developed and launched a completely redesigned camera for the international market in cooperation with the camera manufacturer P+S Technik.

2007–2008
With the set experience of the HS-1, WEISSCAM started the development of the next generation with the aim to create a standalone camera, which is able to work in both „worlds“: HD SDI and RAW. This development created a whole product family: WEISSCAM HS-2 Camera, WEISSCAM DM-2 Digimag, WEISSCAM DBB Debayerbox, WEISSCAM HU-2 Handunit.

2009
After more than 2 years of development WEISSCAM launched the new complete product family on the international market with P+S Technik.

WEISSCAM HS-1 
The equipment of the digital high-speed camera WEISSCAM HS-1 includes the camera HS-1, the Hand Unit and the Controlunit.

 Camera
The Weisscam HS-1 camera body is designed as a combination of the classic form of 2/3“ video camera and the clarity of a film camera body. P+S Technik’s interchangeable mount is integrated to make available the maximum range of lenses designed for 35mm format – motion or still photography You can choose any frame size to fully utilise the camera’s memory. Frame rate up to 1000 frame/s are possible. Maximum resolution of the HS-1 model is 1280 x 1024 pixel.

 Hand Unit
With the Hand Unit most important recording features of the camera can be remote controlled: START/STOP, frame rate adjustment, frame rate ramp settings, frame rate jumps. The ergonomic design allows comfortable one hand use to start and stop recording. With the well fitted hand wheel the frame rate can be changed smoothly while recording.

 Control Unit
The WEISSCAM HS-1 Control Unit is a complete, portable power PC with dual core processor technology. The unit comes with a removable S-ATA hard disk drive for data exchange, an integrated monitor and a waterproof keyboard. The software offers multiple features for image control, color correction, frame size adjustments and shutter control.

 Filmed with WEISSCAM HS-1 (alone or with other cameras)
2009: LU („Le petit déjeuner“), Wagner Pizza („Die Hitze des Vulkansteins“),
2008: Nestlé („Nestlé Classic“), Suzuki („Rock the Road“), Head („Racket“), LIG TV („Station IDs'08“), LU („Le petit déjeuner“), Baden Württembergische Bank („Tee“)
2007: Nike Europe („Nike T90“), BMW Mini („Urban Style on Tour“), Schwarzkopf („Bunch of Roses“), 4711 („Das Wunderwasser“), BMW (Showroom Film „Mini Collections“)
2006: Braun Multiquick („Celebration“), Milka („M-Joy“), Cortal Consors („Gold“), SWR-Trailer („Sport im Dritten“)

WEISSCAM HS-2 
The equipment of the digital high-speed camera WEISSCAM HS-2 manufactured by P+S Technik includes the camera HS-2, the WEISSCAM Digimag DM-2, the WEISSCAM Debayberbox DBB and the WEISSCAM Hand Unit HU-2.

Camera
The WEISSCAM HS-2 is developed as a stand-alone camera targeted toward the needs of cinematographers. 
The HS-2 has a full format Super35 CMOS sensor with a global shutter. By using the Interchangeable Mount System (IMS) you can attach nearly every lens on the camera (PL Mount, Nikon F-Mount, Panavision Mount, etc.).
The output of the WEISSCAM HS-2 offers two streams at the same time and uses the HD SDI interface for both signals. With the WEISSCAM "RAW IN HD SDI" mapping, you are able to transport the RAW files via the worldwide standard and fast HD SDI single and dual link interface.
The HD stream offers YCbCr in 4:2:2. You can choose between linear standard curves like ITU-R 709 or log curve for a higher contrast range within the HD SDI image. 
The RAW stream is a 12-bit uncompressed WEISSCAM RAW file and gives you the freedom to demosaic in post production.
With the WEISSCAM HS-2 there are 2000 frame/s in full HD possible. To record more speed one needs to reduce the recorded resolution on the sensor. For example, in 720p one can record up to 4000 frame/s with the WEISSCAM HS-2.

 Digimag DM-2
The WEISSCAM DIGIMAG DM-2 is an uncompressed and extremely compact HD-SDI single and dual link recorder, which has the uniqueness of recording either YCbCr/ RGB streams or RAW data. 
The RAW data are stored by using the WEISSCAM "RAW in HD SDI" mapping, which allows you to map up to two RAW images in one HD SDI frame and therefore download for example 100 RAW file in 1080p 50 mode. 
There is the possibility to record other cameras signals like ARRIFLEX D20/21, Sony F35, GrassValley Viper, Phantom HD and Standart HDTV (like Sony F900).
For downloading the files you can either use the HD SDI single and dual link output but also the IT interfaces like Fire wire. 
In conjunction with the external WEISSCAM DEBAYERBOX DBB, you are able to do a realtime debayering of the stored RAW data on the DIGIMAG DM-2. You can offer the post house immediately a standard HD YCbC.

 Debayerbox DBB
The WEISSCAM DEBAYERBOX is a realtime hardware debayerer with newest FPGA technology and sophisticated color algorithm. All WEISSCAM RAW formats can be converted into HD SDI YCbCr 4:2:2 single or dual link by just connecting the RAW Input with the HD SDI Output. For the debayering you can choose between 16 different curves from lin to log.

 Hand Unit HU-2
The WEISSCAM HANDUNIT HU-2 fully controls the camera and image processing of the WEISSCAM HS-2. It can either be connected directly by cable or wireless remote controlled. You can set your frame rates, formats, gamma curves, log curves, black level, RGB values, gain, offset, black gamma etc.

 Filmed with WEISSCAM HS-2 (alone or with other cameras)
2009: Panasonic Toyota Formula 1 – Track Day Ascari 2009, Pringles („Pringles Xtreme“)

External links 
 Weisscam Website
 P+S TECHNIK Website

Companies based in Munich
Photography companies of Germany
Electronics companies of Germany